Luthigh (or Ludhigh, pronounced ) is an extinct Paman language formerly spoken on the Cape York Peninsula of Queensland, Australia, by the Luthigh people. It is unknown when it became extinct. It constitutes a single language with Mpalitjanh. According to Sharp (1939), the neighboring Unjadi (Unyadi) language differed only marginally from that spoken by the Okara [Luthigh].

Phonology

Consonant Phonemes

Vowel Phonemes

References 

Northern Paman languages
Extinct languages of Queensland
Indigenous Australian languages in Queensland